This is an episode list for The Real Hustle. All dates are the first broadcast on BBC Three in the United Kingdom. There have been 106 episodes broadcast over 11 series and an additional 3 special episodes and 3 related programs.

Series overview

Series 1 (2006)

Series 2 (2006)

Series 3 (2007)

Series 4 (2007)

Series 5 (Las Vegas)

Series 6 (High Stakes)

Series 7 (On Holiday)

Series 8 (Undercover)

Series 9 (Celebrity Scammers)

Series 10 (New Recruits)

Series 11 (Celebrity Chancers)

Specials

References

Real Hustle